State Highway 21 (SH 21) is a short 6.7 kilometre stretch of highway in the North Island of New Zealand. Its main destination is Hamilton Airport and Mystery Creek, where the National Agricultural Fieldays are held.

SH 21 was gazetted as a brand new state highway designation in 1997.

Oddities
SH 21 is actually 120km south of where the number is supposed to be when considering the general pattern of assigning increasing state highway numbers in a north–south direction; in reality, it should lie somewhere in South Auckland. This southern placement makes SH 21 the second-most southern SH 2x highway, after .

At the exit to Hamilton Airport, SH 21 used to show Hamilton to be in both directions (i.e. left to Hamilton and Rotorua, right to Hamilton and Waitomo Caves), and was possibly the only place in the State Highway network in which this happened (the actual difference between turning left and turning right is only 800 metres).  In 2015 the signs were updated to show Hamilton to the left, and the route to the right is now on a separate sign reading "Hamilton via State Highway 3".

Major intersections

Narrows Bridge 
The first bridge opened on 12 February 1879, costing £999 17s 4d, with a £300 government subsidy, £90 each from Waipa and Waikato County Councils and the rest paid by donations, paid by a long list of subscribers from 1878. It lasted until blown up in 1940.

Its  reinforced concrete replacement, supported by a  steel arch, opened in December 1939. It was given a NZHPT Category 2 historic listing in 1985. The river banks were soil nailed in 2010 to protect the foundations. The effect of the works can be seen in the AADT figures – 2008 (5087), 2009 (5288), 2010 (4972), 2011 (4921), 2012 (4910), 2013 (4892), 2014 (5391), 2015 (5551).

See also
List of New Zealand state highways
List of roads and highways, for notable or famous roads worldwide

References

External links
 New Zealand Transport Agency
Narrows Bridge 1939 photos –
 arch construction
 old and new bridges
old bridge before 1939

21
Transport in Waikato